Hina-Lau-Limu-Kala is the goddess of the sea in Hawaiian mythology.

References 
 Robert D. Craig: Dictionary of Polynesian Mythology, 1989

Hawaiian goddesses
Sea and river goddesses